The 1925 New South Wales state election was held on 30 May 1925. This election was for all of the 90 seats in the 27th New South Wales Legislative Assembly and was conducted in multiple-member constituencies using the Hare Clark single transferable vote. The 26th parliament of New South Wales was dissolved on 18 April 1925 by the Governor, Sir Dudley de Chair, on the advice of the Premier Sir George Fuller.

It was a close win for the Labor Party Leader, Jack Lang, which had a majority of just one seat in the Assembly, defeating Fuller's Nationalist/Progressive Coalition.

Key dates

Results

{{Australian elections/Title row
| table style = float:right;clear:right;margin-left:1em;
| title        = New South Wales state election, 30 May 1925
| house        = Legislative Assembly
| series       = New South Wales state election
| back         = 1922
| forward      = 1927
| enrolled     = 1,339,080
| total_votes  = 924,979
| turnout %    = 69.08
| turnout chg  = −0.93
| informal     = 30,155
| informal %   = 3.26
| informal chg = −0.37
}}

|}

Retiring members

Changing seats

See also
 Candidates of the 1925 New South Wales state election
 Members of the New South Wales Legislative Assembly, 1925–1927

Notes

References

Elections in New South Wales
New South Wales state election
1920s in New South Wales
New South Wales state election